The 1919 Oregon Agricultural Aggies football team represented Oregon Agricultural College (now known as Oregon State University) in the Pacific Coast Conference (PCC) during the 1919 college football season. In their second and final season under head coach Homer Woodson Hargiss, the Aggies compiled a 4–4–1 record (1–3 against PCC opponents), finished in last place in the PCC, and outscored their opponents by a combined total of 143 to 64. The team played its home games at Bell Field in Corvallis, Oregon. Raymond Archibald was the team captain.

Schedule

References

Oregon Agricultural
Oregon State Beavers football seasons
Oregon Agricultural Aggies football